Beltway 8 (BW8), the Sam Houston Parkway, along with the Sam Houston Tollway, is an  beltway around the city of Houston, Texas, United States, lying entirely within Harris County.

Beltway 8, a state highway maintained by the Texas Department of Transportation (TxDOT), runs mostly along the frontage roads of the tollway, only using the main lanes where they are free: between Interstate 45 (I-45, North Freeway) and Interstate 69/US Highway 59 (I-69/US 59, Eastex Freeway); and between US 90 (Crosby Freeway) and I-10 (Baytown-East Freeway). The main lanes elsewhere are the Sam Houston Tollway, a toll road owned and operated by the Harris County Toll Road Authority (HCTRA). East of Houston, the tollway crosses the Houston Ship Channel on the Sam Houston Ship Channel Bridge, a toll bridge; this forms a gap in Beltway 8 between I-10 (Baytown-East Freeway) and State Highway 225 (SH 225, La Porte Freeway).

Beltway 8 is the intermediate beltway in the Houston area. The inner beltway, I-610, lies mostly within Houston (except for an approximate  stretch that runs through the City of Bellaire), and the outer beltway, SH 99 (Grand Parkway), is currently partially complete.

Route description

Free sections
The longest free section of main lanes is on the north side of Houston, stretching from Ella Boulevard east to Mesa Drive. This is maintained by TxDOT east of roughly the Hardy Toll Road interchange. This particular free section has remained untolled since its 1969 opening because of accessibility to George Bush Intercontinental Airport. It includes the interchanges with I-69/US 59 (Eastex Freeway), John F. Kennedy Boulevard, the Hardy Toll Road, and I-45 (North Freeway).

Three shorter free sections also exist:
North of Wallisville Road to Jacinto Port Boulevard, including the I-10 (Baytown-East Freeway) interchange.
SH 3 (Galveston Road) to Beamer Road, including the I-45 (Gulf Freeway) interchange.
West Airport Boulevard to Beechnut Street, including the I-69/US 59 (Southwest Freeway) interchange.

The frontage roads are generally continuous, and allow for slower free travel along the tolled segments. Only one break exists in the frontage roads; there are also several locations where one must turn to stay on them:
Jacinto Port Boulevard to SH 225—the frontage roads do not cross the Houston Ship Channel (and thus that piece of Beltway 8 was removed in 1978).
Deerwood Drive to Boheme Drive—both directions are on the east side of the tollway for the crossing of Buffalo Bayou.
West Little York Road to US 290 (Northwest Freeway)—both directions shift to the west side, intersecting US 290 at Senate Avenue, northwest of the tollway. The west side shift was eliminated in late 2013 where the frontage road right of way was extended to US 290 as part of the US 290 widening project—the former lanes which shifted to the west side was re-routed to the new frontage roads with a signalized crossing. 
At the Katy Freeway, some of the frontage road lanes bypass the intersection, allowing vehicles on the frontage road to travel through the interchange without stopping at traffic lights. The bypass was incorporated into the Katy Freeway reconstruction project to relieve congestion and elevated since a majority of the intersection is below grade level which had a past history of flooding during heavy rains.
A section of the frontage road at Mykawa Road shared the right-of-way with the tollway from 1997 to 2016 (which merged into a single lane); with the widening of the tolled lanes between SH 288 and I-45, TxDOT constructed two flyover ramps (completed July 2016) which goes over a railroad right of way with two lanes per direction (this was originally planned back in 1997 until the widening project from the Southwest Freeway to I-10 east revived it). Back in 1997 when the southern portion of the tollway opened up motorists were forced to make a turn onto Mykawa Road and head south to Knapp Road in Pearland where it had an at-grade railroad crossing (the City of Pearland removed the access to the railroad crossing where a section of McHard Road during the mid-2000s a few miles south incorporated a flyover bridge over the existing railroad right-of-way).

Lane configuration
The lane count is for mainlanes only, unless otherwise noted. Starting at the north end of the Sam Houston Ship Channel Bridge, and moving in a clockwise direction, mainlane counts are as follows:

 Two lanes each way between I-10 (East Freeway) and State Highway 225 (includes the Sam Houston Ship Channel Bridge);
 Four lanes each way between SH 225 and SH 3 (Galveston Road);
 Three lanes each way between SH 3 (Galveston Road) and Beamer Road;
 Four lanes each way between Beamer Road and SH 288 (South Freeway)
 Four lanes each way between SH 288 (South Freeway) and I-69/US 59 (Southwest Freeway);
 Four lanes each way between I-69/US 59 (Southwest Freeway) and US 290 (portions between I-69/US 59 and Westpark Tollway);
 Four lanes each way between US 290 and West Road;
 Five lanes counterclockwise and four lanes clockwise between West Road and Gessner Road;
 Four lanes each way between Gessner Road and I-45;
 Three lanes each way between I-45 and JFK Boulevard (construction started in 2012 to add additional lanes to this section);
 Four lanes each way between JFK Boulevard and I-69/US 59 (Eastex Freeway); and
 Three lanes each way between I-69/US 59 (Eastex Freeway) and I-10 (East Freeway).

Tolls

Enforcement

A number of cameras are located at toll booths to record license plate information to a database and send a ticket for toll violations via mail. Recently, this system has been upgraded to alert local authorities if a vehicle has been flagged for any reason, including AMBER Alerts. When a flagged vehicle is detected, it notifies the closest law enforcement officer to investigate. At this time, Precinct 5 Constables and Harris County Sheriff's Office are being notified, but Houston Police Department has shown interest and wishes to be included to be notified. The total number of cameras that are planned for the system is 35.

History
A previous route numbered Loop 8 was designated on September 25, 1939, in Beaumont, running from US 59 (later US 96, after the 1939 redescription of the highway system) at Gladys Street via Gulf Street, North Street, and Fourth Street to US 90 as a renumbering of SH 8 Loop. This route was cancelled on January 18, 1944.

Houston, known for its fast population growth, began planning for a second beltway in the 1950s (the first was the I-610 loop, created between the 1950s and the 1970s). The beltway was designated as part of the state highway system, reusing the Loop 8 number, on May 7, 1969. Because the proposed route had been referred to locally as the Outer Belt, and Harris County used similar nomenclature for segments of the route, the designation was changed to Beltway 8 on July 31, 1969. It is the only state highway loop to bear the "Beltway" designation.

The beltway's construction was done in a piecemeal fashion, beginning with the opening of West Belt Drive and Roark Road, two surface streets, in the mid-1970s. Efforts to construct a bridge over the Houston Ship Channel were stymied until the Texas Turnpike Authority (TTA) was able to do so as a toll facility in the late 1970s. As a result, the section of Beltway 8 from I-10 to SH 225 on the east side of Houston was removed from the state highway system on July 24, 1978. The Jesse H. Jones Memorial Bridge was opened in 1982. The TTA, however, turned down the opportunity to improve the entire beltway as well, leaving Harris County to upgrade the road to freeway standards. However, Harris County could not afford to build and maintain a freeway from its general fund.

In September 1983, county voters approved a referendum by a 7–3 margin to release up to $900 million in bonds to create two toll roads, the Hardy Toll Road (basically a reliever for I-45 between downtown Houston and Montgomery County) and the Sam Houston Tollway, which would be the main lanes of the Beltway. Shortly after the referendum, the Harris County Commissioners Court created the HCTRA to administer the construction and operation of the new road system. Then-County Judge Jon Lindsay is generally credited with shepherding the referendum from its infancy to its passage, along with the implementation of the plan for the roadway. During the public information campaign leading up to the referendum, the county government published brochures stating that the toll roads would become free once their construction costs had been recouped, but the tolls were not removed after the tollways were paid off.

In 1989, The Bangles performed at the opening of the segment of Beltway 8 between I-10 (Katy Freeway) and US 290. On July 7, 1990, a ceremony, called Road Party II, took place for the opening of the section of Beltway 8 between I-45 (North Freeway) and US 290, the final segment. Organizers had planned for a crowd of 100,000. KLOL, a radio station, sponsored the event. Jerry Lightfoot & The Essential Band did the opening 80-minute set. The band Huey Lewis and the News performed at the ceremony. The segment between US 290 and I-45 opened on July 8, 1990. The project was on schedule and $133 million (equivalent to $ in ) under budget.

Despite recent speculation about the possibility of the Sam Houston Tollway being sold by HCTRA to a private firm, the Harris County Commissioners Court unanimously voted to keep the tollway in the hands of HCTRA.

On September 3, 2007, the toll increased by $0.25 system wide with some exceptions.

On February 26, 2011, construction of the main lanes between I-69/US 59 (Eastex Freeway) and US 90 (Crosby Freeway) was completed, thus completing the entire beltway system. This section was originally set to be completed between 2007 and 2009, but funding issues delayed its completion. The project cost $400 million (equivalent to $ in ) and was completed ahead of schedule and under budget. The new  section has three lanes in each direction, and an EZ Tag, TxTag or TollTag will be required to access it. Almost 60 years had passed between the planning of Beltway 8 and the opening of the final section.

On August 28, 2017, Hurricane Harvey caused flooding to the West Belt and caused damage near I-10.

Exit list

See also

References

External links

Harris County Toll Road Authority

Transportation in Harris County, Texas
Freeways in Houston
008
008
Beltways in the United States